Dying Machines is the creation of New Orleans multi-instrumentalist and producer Thomas Buschbach (born June 13, 1978). Dying Machines combines droning guitars with classical instrumentation into cinematic music that is similar in style to Hans Zimmer, Stars of the Lid, Arvo Pärt and John Murphy, all of whom have been cited as influences on Dying Machines' style.

Dying Machines is currently signed to Mush Records, who released Nicht Sprechen and What I Have Not Forgotten in 2012 and 2013 respectively. Both EPs were critically well-received despite the relative obscurity of the genre.

Discography

Albums 
 You (2015)

EPs 
 Nicht Sprechen (2012)
 What I Have Not Forgotten (2013)
 Someday Home (unreleased) (2014)

References

External links 
 Official website 
 Mush Records artist page
 Jigger dyeing machine
 winch dyeing machine

American post-rock groups
American space rock musical groups
American experimental musical groups
American ambient music groups
Musical groups from New Orleans
Dream pop musical groups
American shoegaze musical groups
American art rock groups